Varakļāni Palace is a palace in Varakļāni, Varakļāni Municipality in the historical region of Latgale, in Latvia.

History 
After the end of the Livonian War in 1583,  family acquired the Vark castle district, it was called "Vark land".
The palace was designed by the Italian architect Vincenzo Macotti at the request of the estate owner, the Polish–Lithuanian Commonwealth diplomat Count Michał Jan Borch. Construction started in 1783 and completed in 1789.

After the death of Count Borch in 1810, his wife, Eleonor Christine (1766-1844), and later their son, Karol Borch (1798-1861), whose daughter Maria married  (1834–1876), operated the palace. After his death, the manor was inherited by their daughter, Teresa Sanguszko-Kowelska (1864-1954), who married  (1856-1893).
 
After Latvian Agrarian Reform in 1920s Varaklani Manor was nationalized and subdivided. From 1921 to 1944 the Varaklani State Gymnasium, later until 1961 the senior classes of Varaklani High School, operated in the castle. At the end of World War II the castle was a military hospital.

The building housed the Varakļāni secondary school from 1921 to 1960. In the mid-1980s the castle conservation works begin. At the entrance of the castle there is a memorial plaque for the linguist Leonard Latkovsky.
Since 1997, the castle has housed the Varaklani Regional Museum, which since 2009 has been the Tourist Information Center.The palace and grounds are currently administered by the town of Varakļāni.

See also
List of palaces and manor houses in Latvia

References

External links

  Varakļāni Palace

Palaces in Latvia
Varakļāni Municipality
Neoclassical architecture in Latvia
Neoclassical palaces